Braley is an unincorporated community in Clinton County, in the U.S. state of Missouri.

The community was named in honor of Charles A. Braley, a railroad official.

References

Unincorporated communities in Clinton County, Missouri
Unincorporated communities in Missouri